This is a district-wise list of pharmacy schools located in Pakistan and accredited by Pharmacy Council of Pakistan.

Azad Kashmir

Mirpur
 Mohi-ud-Din Islamic University - Pharm. D.
 Akson College of Pharmacy - Pharm. D.

Rawlakot
University of Poonch, Rawlakot

Balochistan

Quetta
 Department of Pharmacy, University of Balochistan - B. Pharmacy, Pharm. D.

Capital Territory

Islamabad
 Shifa College of Pharmaceutical Sciences, Shifa Tameer-e-Millat University - Pharm. D.

 Hamdard University (Islamabad Campus) - B. Pharmacy, Pharm. D.
 Riphah Institute of Pharmacy, Riphah International University - Pharm. D.
 Department of Pharmacy, University of Lahore (Islamabad Campus) - Pharm. D.
 Quaid-i-Azam University - Pharm. D. Public

Khyber Pakhtunkhwa

Abbottabad
 Department of Pharmacy, Abbottabad University of Science and Technology - Pharm. D.
 Department of Pharmacy, COMSATS Institute of Information Technology - Pharm. D.
 Women Institute of Learning - Pharm. D.
 Pakistan Institute of Professional Studies - Pharm.D

Dera Ismail Khan
 Faculty of Pharmacy, Gomal University - B. Pharmacy, Pharm. D.

Kohat
 Department of Pharmacy, Kohat University of Science and Technology - Pharm. D.

Malakand
 Department of Pharmacy, University of Malakand, Batkhela - Pharm. D.

Mardan
 Abdul Wali Khan University Mardan - Pharm. D.

Peshawar
 Department of Pharmacy, University of Peshawar - B. Pharmacy, Pharm. D.
 Faculty of Pharmacy, Sarhad University of Science and Information Technology - Pharm. D.
 Department of Pharmacy, Abasyn University - Pharm. D.

Swabi
 University of Swabi - Pharm. D.

Punjab

Sargodha
Faculty of Pharmacy, University of Sargodha - Pharm. D. Public

Bahawalpur
 Faculty of Pharmacy, Islamia University - B. Pharmacy, Pharm. D. Public

Faisalabad
 College of Pharmacy, Government College University, Faisalabad - Pharm. D. Public
 Faculty of Pharmacy, University of Faisalabad - Pharm. D.                         
Institute of pharmacy, physiology &pharmacology  University of Agriculture, Faisalabad- Pharm.D.Public

Lahore
 University College of Pharmacy, University of the Punjab - B. Pharmacy, Pharm. D. Public
Forman Christian Chartered University [FCCU] - Pharm.d Department
 Institute of Pharmaceutical Sciences, University of Veterinary and Animal Sciences - Pharm. D.Public
 Lahore College of Pharmaceutical Sciences - B. Pharmacy, Pharm. D.
 University of Central Punjab - Pharm. D.
 Faculty of Pharmacy, University of Lahore (Lahore Campus) - B. Pharmacy, Pharm. D.
 Faculty of Pharmacy, Hajvery University - Pharm. D.
 Akhtar Saeed College of Pharmaceutical Sciences - Pharm. D.
 Lahore Pharmacy College - Pharm. D.
 The Superior College - Pharm. D.
 Riphah International University, (Lahore Campus) - Pharm. D.
 University of South Asia (Pakistan) - Pharm. D.
 Department of Pharmacy, Lahore College for Women University - B. Pharmacy, Pharm. D. Public
 Leads College of Pharmacy - Pharm. D.
 Johar Institute of Professional Studies - Pharm. D.
 Gulab Devi Institute of Pharmacy, Gulab Devi Educational Complex, Lahore - Pharm. D (Doctor of Pharmacy)
 Pak Institute of Pharmaceutical Sciences
Rashid latif Medical College Institute of Pharmaceutical Science

Multan
 Faculty of Pharmacy, Bahauddin Zakriya University - B. Pharmacy, Pharm. D. Public
 Department of Pharmacy, Southern Punjab Institute of Health Sciences (SPIHS), Multan - Pharm. D. Private

Rawalpindi
 Margalla Institute of Health Sciences (Margalla College of Pharmacy) - Pharm. D.
 Yusra Institute of Pharmaceutical Science

Sialkot
 Islam College of Pharmacy - Pharm. D.

Kharian
 Cadson College of Pharmacy - Pharm. D

Sindh

Faculty of Pharmacy of University of Sindh.

Programs:
Doctor of Pharmacy of 5 years (pharm.D)

Karachi
 Faculty of Pharmacy, University of Karachi - B. Pharmacy, Pharm. D.
 College of Pharmacy, Dow University of Health Sciences - Pharm. D.
 Institute of Pharmaceutical Sciences, Baqai Medical University - B. Pharmacy, Pharm. D.
 Faculty of Pharmacy, Jinnah University for Women - B. Pharmacy, Pharm. D.
 Faculty of Pharmacy, Hamdard University (Karachi Campus) - B. Pharmacy, Pharm. D.
 Faculty of Pharmacy, Ziauddin University - Pharm. D.
 College of Pharmacy Nazeer Hussain University - Pharm D.
 Faculty of pharmacy  (IQRA UNIVERSITY NORTH CAMPUS)
college of pharmacy , jinnah college of pharmacy /su pharm d

Shaheed Benazirababd
college of pharmacy , Peoples University of Medical and Health Scienes - Pharm. D.

References

 List of pharmacy schools accredited by Pharmacy Council of Pakistan

 
Pharmacy schools
Pakistan